Orodrominae is a subfamily of thescelosaurid dinosaurs known from the Cretaceous of North America and Asia.

Distribution
Orodromines were a mostly North American based group with fossils from Canada and United States only. Albertadromeus, as its name suggests, is only from the upper (later) part of the Oldman Formation in the Belly River Group of Alberta, Canada. Orodromeus, the type genus, was widespread through Montana. Its holotype was found at the Egg Mountain in the Two Medicine Formation. Oryctodromeus fossils were found in the Lima Peaks section of the Blackleaf Formation, also from Montana. Zephyrosaurus, the most widespread genus, lived in southern Montana and northern Wyoming. The locality of its holotype is the Wolf Creek Canyon, which is a sandstone in the Cloverly Formation.

Age
Orodromines are widespread throughout time, starting in the Aptian and ending in the Campanian. The earliest fossils are of Zephyrosaurus and are from the Aptian (113 Ma). After a 13 million year gap in the fossil record, fossils of the less common Oryctodromeus date to about 95 Ma in the Cenomanian. The next chronological fossils are from 76.5 Ma and belong to Albertadromeus. The latest orodromine fossils in the fossil record belong to the type genus, Orodromeus, and date to 75 Ma.

Paleoecology

All orodromines lived the lifestyle of a ground dwelling herbivore. Oryctodromeus burrows have been discovered. Orodromeus and Zephyrosaurus also probably lived in burrows.

Classification
Orodrominae is the sister taxon of Thescelosaurinae. Its parent taxon is Thescelosauridae (Brown et al, 2013).

Phylogeny
Prior to the description of Orodrominae, the genera now assigned to the subfamily were often considered part of Hypsilophodontidae. Hypsilophodontidae is now considered obsolete, and its former members have been considered to form a paraphyletic assemblage of basal euornithopods. The cladogram below is based on a phylogenetic analysis by Brown et al., 2013.

More recent analyses recover a slightly different topology

References

Cretaceous dinosaurs